The American Buddhist Society and Fellowship, Inc. is a Buddhist organization founded by Robert Ernest Dickhoff in 1945 and incorporated in 1947. The organization has one location in New York City. The organizations main tenet was the conscientious objection to medical care and the belief that  insurances were equivalent to gambling and therefore counter posed to the healing nature of positive energy.  Their belief was that a wager or insurance on sickness or death would only put negative karma into the universe and lead to more suffering.

References
Lewis, James R. The Encyclopedia of Cults, Sects, and New Religions. Amherst, NY: Prometheus Books, 1998. .

Buddhism in New York (state)
Religion in New York City
1945 establishments in New York City